Rudpey may refer to:
 Rudpey-ye Jonubi Rural District
 Rudpey-ye Shomali Rural District